This page covers a group of dicotyledon families (Lauraceae to Salicaceae). For the background to this list see parent article List of the vascular plants of Britain and Ireland.

Status key: * indicates an introduced species and e indicates an extinct species.

This division of the eudicots is shown in the following cladogram:

Order Ceratophyllales

Family Ceratophyllaceae (coontails, hornworts)

Order Ranunculales

Family Ranunculaceae (buttercup family)

Order Gunnerales

Family Gunneraceae

Basal angiosperms

Order Nymphaeales

Family Nymphaeaceae (waterlilies)

Magnoliids

Order Laurales

Family Lauraceae (laurel family)

Order Piperales

Family Aristolochiaceae (birthwort family)

Superasterids

Order Caryophyllales

Family Aizoaceae (ice plants, carpet weeds)

Order Santalales

Family Santalaceae (sandalwoods)

Asterids

Order Cornales

Family Hydrangeaceae (hydrangea family)

Order Escalloniales

Family Escalloniaceae (Escallonia family)

Order Ericales

Family Balsaminaceae (balsam family)

Campanulids

Order Asterales

Family Menyanthaceae

Family Asteraceae (aster, daisy, composite, or sunflower family)

Order Apiales

Family Pittosporaceae

Family Araliaceae (ginseng family)

Family Apiaceae (celery, carrot or parsley family; umbellifers)

Family Polemoniaceae (Jacob's-ladder or phlox family)

Order Aquifoliales

Family Aquifoliaceae (holly)

Order Dipsacales

Family Adoxaceae (moschatel family)

Family Caprifoliaceae (honeysuckle family)

Superrosids

References

03